Richard Sisson is a British pianist and composer. As well as concert works, he has composed extensively for the theatre. He was also until 2011, part of the cabaret double-act Kit and The Widow, alongside Kit Hesketh-Harvey.

Sisson was educated at King's College, Taunton and the University of Cambridge, where he was a member of the Footlights. He currently teaches A-Level music and composition at Luton Sixth Form College, and regularly composes and plays for radio and television.

References

External links
 Profile on PBJ Agent's website
 Profile on Symphonia Academica's website

British musical theatre composers
British classical pianists
Living people
Year of birth missing (living people)
People educated at King's College, Taunton
21st-century pianists
Place of birth missing (living people)
British music educators